Kelly Leroy Mantle (born July 9, 1976), is an American actor, singer-songwriter, comedian, musician, drag queen, and reality television personality. Mantle appeared as a contestant on the sixth season of the reality TV show RuPaul's Drag Race.

Early life
Mantle was born to Larry James and Linda Lea Mantle in Oklahoma City but grew up in Cordell, Oklahoma. They have a brother, Garrette.

Mantle's uncle was professional baseball player Mickey Mantle, who played for the New York Yankees. Mantle graduated with a BFA in Theatre from the University of Oklahoma.

Career
After college, Mantle went to Chicago to begin a career as an actor. She acted in plays such as The Convention and Royal Flush. Lone Star/Laundry & Bourbon was the first production by OKRA Theatre, a theater company started by Mantle and her friend Tracy Parks, who directed the play.

In 1998, Mantle starred in the Chicago production of Charles Busch's play Vampire Lesbians of Sodom. After two years of living in Chicago, she moved to Los Angeles. She later auditioned for the Los Angeles production of Vampire Lesbians of Sodom, where she was scouted and signed by a talent agent.

In Los Angeles, Mantle became a member of the band Sex with Lurch, which was formed by singer Robbie Quinne and guitarist Bernard Yin. As part of the group, Mantle used the stage name "Brandy Warhol". The group disbanded in December 2002. Mantle later joined Quinne's follow-up band, the Barbarellatones.

Mantle was also a member of the band Tranzkuntinental. The band was started by Charlie Paulson and Xander Smith and features drag queens Detox, Rhea Litré, Vicky Vox, and Willam Belli.

Currently, Mantle is a member of the band the Rollz Royces with Tammie Brown and Michael Catti. Mantle and Catti have appeared in Tammie Brown's Christmas show Holiday Sparkle at Fubar in West Hollywood.

In 2014 Mantle starred in Confessions of a Womanizer with Gary Busey. The film was released in 2016. Mantle, who is genderfluid, made history when the film's producers sought both supporting actor and supporting actress consideration for her performance and The Academy granted the request.

Mantle starred as Sheila on both seasons of the OutTV and Amazon Prime sitcom The Browns alongside Tammie Brown and in 2022 supported Trixie and Katya on their tour Trixie and Katya Live.

RuPaul's Drag Race
In December 2013, Logo announced that Mantle was among fourteen drag queens who would be competing on the sixth season of RuPaul's Drag Race. She was eliminated in the first episode, lip-synching to Express Yourself against Vivacious.

Discography

Albums
 Ever Changing (2002)
 Rock-N-Glow (2004)
 Satellite Baby (2006)

Singles

Music videos

Filmography

Film

Television

Web series

Theatre

References

External links
 
 

Living people
American drag queens
American television actors
LGBT people from Oklahoma
American LGBT singers
Actors from Oklahoma City
People from New Cordell, Oklahoma
American non-binary actors
Kelly Mantle
University of Oklahoma alumni
1976 births
Non-binary drag performers
Genderfluid people